The Vilyuy Plateau is a mountain plateau in Krasnoyarsk Krai and the Sakha Republic (Yakutia), Siberia, Russia. It is a part of the Central Siberian Plateau and it is made up mainly of the upper course section of the Vilyuy River.

Geography  
The Vilyuy Plateau is located both north and south of the Arctic Circle in northeastern Krasnoyarsk Krai and western Sakha Republic. To the southwest it borders Irkutsk Oblast. To the north rises the Anabar Plateau, to the west the Syverma Plateau and to the northwest the Putorana Mountains. To the east the plateau descends gradually towards the broad Lena River valley and to the southeast it runs into the Central Yakutian Lowland, which leads to the Lena Plateau on the southern side.

The major rivers having their source in the plateau are the Vilyuy, Markha, Olenyok and Ygyatta. River Ulakhan-Botuobuya flows across it. There are also numerous lakes, including the man-made Vilyuy Reservoir.

Flora and climate
There is larch taiga on the mountain slopes, with thickets of prostrate alder and mountain tundra on the higher elevations. There are meadows in the river valleys.

The climate prevailing in the Vilyuy Plateau is subarctic continental. The winters are some of the most severe in the Northern Hemisphere.

References

External links
Soil Cover of the North of Central Siberia
Analyzing winter migration fidelity and movement of the wild Taimyr reindeer herd, Rangifer T. tarandus
Central Siberian Plateau
Landforms of Krasnoyarsk Krai
Plateaus of the Sakha Republic
Landforms of Irkutsk Oblast